Tumsar is a city and the headquarters of Tumsar Taluka in Bhandara district of Maharashtra, India.

Climate 
The weather is very well balanced in all seasons excluding summer, temperatures in summers as high as 48 degrees Celsius and in winters as cool as 12 degrees Celsius.

References

Cities and towns in Bhandara district